DWHY (100.7 FM), broadcasting as 100.7 Star FM, is a radio station owned and operated by Bombo Radyo Philippines through its licensee People's Broadcasting Service, Inc. Its studio, offices and transmitter are located at the Bombo Radyo Broadcast Center, Maramba Bankers Village, Brgy. Bonuan Catacdang, Dagupan.

References

External links
Star FM Dagupan FB Page
Star FM Dagupan Website

Bombo Radyo Philippines
Radio stations in Dagupan
Radio stations established in 1992